Tin Heng is an MTR Light Rail stop. It is at ground level of Tin Shui Road near Tin Heng Estate, in Tin Shui Wai, Yuen Long District, Hong Kong. It began service on 7 December 2003 and belongs to Zone 5A.

References

MTR Light Rail stops
Former Kowloon–Canton Railway stations
Tin Shui Wai
Railway stations in Hong Kong opened in 2003
MTR Light Rail stops named from housing estates
2003 establishments in Hong Kong